Zinc finger protein 197 is a protein that in humans is encoded by the ZNF197 gene.

Function

This gene product belongs to the zinc finger protein superfamily, members of which are regulatory proteins characterized by nucleic acid-binding zinc finger domains. The encoded protein contains 20 tandemly arrayed C2H2-type zinc fingers, a Kruppel-associated box (KRAB) domain, and a SCAN box. This transcript turns over rapidly and contains 3' UTR AUUUA motifs, which are often a hallmark of rapid turnover. It is overexpressed in some thyroid papillary carcinomas. This gene is located in a cluster of zinc finger genes at 3p21. Naturally-occurring readthrough transcription is observed between this gene and the upstream zinc finger protein 660 gene and is represented by GeneID:110354863.

References

Further reading